This was the first edition of the tournament.

Robin Haase and Philipp Oswald won the title after defeating Hugo Nys and Fabien Reboul 6–3, 6–4 in the final.

Seeds

Draw

References

External links
 Main draw

Kozerki Open - Doubles